Siegfried Voß  (16 June 1940, in Königsberg – 22 April 2011, in Halle) was a German actor winner of the 1987 Handel Prize presented by the city of Halle.

References

Sources 
 ,  (editors): Das Fernsehtheater Moritzburg. Institution und Spielplan. Leipziger Universitätsverlag, Leipzig 2003. .
 Claudia Kusebauch (editor): Fernsehtheater Moritzburg II. Programmgeschichte. Leipziger Universitätsverlag, Leipzig 2005. .
 Claudia Kusebauch (in collaboration with ): Das Fernsehtheater Moritzburg – Programmchronologie. Ebd., p. 15–208.

External links 
 
 Siegfried Voß on Filmportal
 Siegfried Voß on Deutsche Synchronkartei

German male film actors
German male stage actors
Audiobook narrators
German male voice actors
Handel Prize winners
1940 births
2011 deaths
Actors from Königsberg